Baranovskaya is a rural locality (a village) in Beketovskoye Rural Settlement, Vozhegodsky District, Vologda Oblast, Russia. The population was 46 as of 2002.

Geography 
The distance to Vozhega is 43 km, to Beketovskaya is 9 km. Nazarovskaya, Surkovskaya, Navolok are the nearest rural localities.

References 

Rural localities in Vozhegodsky District